Piloti (trans. The Pilots) is a rock band from Belgrade. Formed in 1981, and initially immersed in the Yugoslav new wave scene, the band later moved towards mainstream pop rock, they came to prominence in the 1980s and early 1990s as one of the leading pop rock acts in former Yugoslavia. The band disbanded in 1997, only to be reformed in 2009 under the name Kiki Lesendrić & Piloti.

History

New wave years (1981—1982) 
The band was formed in 1981, by the former members of Kako, a band whose greatest claim to fame was appearing as one of the seven opening acts for Bijelo Dugme spectacular concert at the Belgrade JNA stadium in 1979. The inaugural lineup of Piloti was: Zoran "Kiki" Lesendrić (vocals, guitar), Dragan Andrić (bass guitar), Goran Bogićević (guitar) and Nenad Antanasijević (drums).

Their debut album Piloti (The Pilots) was released on August 27, 1981 by PGP-RTB and produced by the former Generacija 5 guitarist Dragan Jovanović. All of the tracks were composed and written by Lesandrić, with the exception of "Imam diplomu", "Svi smo mi ponekad anđeli" and "Veseli momci", co-written by Lesandrić and Goran Bogićević. Song "Ne veruj u idole" ("Don't Believe in Idols") became an instant hit, and was included on several new wave compilation records.

After the success with their debut album, the followup, entitled Dvadeset godina (Twenty Years) was released on April 20, 1982 by PGP-RTB, and was produced by Saša Habić. All tracks were composed and written by Lesandrić including the minor hits "Dvadeset godina" ("Twenty Years"), "Noć u gradu" ("A Night in the City"), "Džoni je krenuo u rat" ("Johnny Went to War") and "Ja sam jurio za vetrom" ("I Have Chased the Wind"). During late 1982, the band started working on their third album, Zvuci civilizacije (The Sounds of Civilisation), which was never released because of Lesandrić's army obligations, and the band went on hiatus.

Mainstream rock years (1984-1991) 
Piloti re-assembled during the late 1984 with the entirely new line-up, featuring Kiki Lesendrić, as the only returnee from the original lineup, and the newly arrived Zoran "Ćera" Obradović (drums), Safet "Saja" Petrovac (guitar), and Miško Plavi, formerly of D' Boys (bass guitar).

The band's third album Kao ptica na mom dlanu (Like a Bird on My Palm) was released on May 25, 1987 by PGP-RTB and produced by Dušan Petrović "Šane". The author of all songs was Lesendrić, except for "Noć čeka nas" ("The Night Is Waiting for Us") which he co-wrote with Bogićević and "Pišem po zidu" ("I'm Writing on the Wall") with Ilija Stanković. A large number of musicians contributed to the album recording: Dejan Grujić (bass guitar), Darko Grujić (keyboard), Vlada Negovanović (guitar), Enco Lesić (keyboards), Valdet Šaćiri (keyboards), Jovan Maljoković (saxophone), Nenad Stefanović "Japanac" (bass guitar), Bane Lesendrić (backing vocals), Oliver Mandić, Momčilo Bajagić "Bajaga", Kornelije Kovač, Zana Nimani and others. The greatest hit from this album was the title track, and other hit songs were "Kada sanjamo" ("When we Dream"), "Rekla je da u mojoj glavi čuje gitare i bubnjeve" ("She Said She Heard Guitars and Drums in My Head") and "Devojka bez imena" ("A Girl with no Name").

The fourth album Osmeh letnje noći (A Midsummer Night Smile) was published on May 11, 1988 by PGP-RTB, and produced by the band themselves for the first time. The author of all the songs was Lesandrić. Musicians who contributed to this album were Saša Lokner (keyboards), Bane Lesendrić (backing vocals), Viktorija (backing vocals in song "Sa tvoje strane ulice") and Zoran Vračević (percussion). The greatest hit from this album was "Leto" ("Summer") and minor hits were "Ako misliš da sam tužan" ("If You Think I'm Sad") and "Ona" ("She"). During 1989, guitarist Petrovac left the band and Bane Lesandrić, Kiki's brother joined.

The fifth album Neka te Bog čuva za mene (May God Save You for Me) was published on March 29, 1990 for PGP-RTB in band's production. The author of songs was Kiki, except for "Jedino što nam ostaje" ("The Only Thing Left") (a cover of Pete Townshend) and "Tiho, tiho" ("Silently, Silently") by Bane Lesandrić. Laza Ristovski contributed to this album by playing the keyboards on two songs. The special guests were Goran Bregović (Guitar solo on "Tiho, tiho"), Jovan Maljoković (saxophone), Darko Grujić (backing vocals) and Zana vocalist Jelena Galonić (backing vocals). The greatest hit from the album was "Tajna je u tebi skrivena" ("The Secret Is Hidden inside You") and minor hits were "Tiho, tiho" and "Neka te bog čuva za mene". The following year, on August 22, 1991 PGP-RTB published Piloti's Greatest Hits album.

Commercial peak, disbandment (1993-1997) 
In 1993 Piloti published the soundtrack for the movie Zaboravljeni (The Forgotten Ones) for PGP-RTS. The songs were written by Lesandrić, Marina Tucaković, Goran Bregović (the track "Spavaju li oči nebeske" ("Do the Eyes in the Sky Sleep")) and Laza Ristovski (the title track). Guests on the album were Goran Bregović, Marko Nafta, Nenad Stefanović "Japanac", Bata Božanić and others. The album brought their greatest hit "Zaboravljeni", and other two hits were "Čini mi se da" ("It Seems to Me") and "Kao da je mesec stao za nas dvoje" ("As if the Moon Had Stopped for the Two of Us").

Between 1993 and 1996, Piloti were on hiatus while Kiki Lesendrić worked with many Serbian artists. The band was back on stage in 1996 for the Budva Summer Festival with the song "Neverna si" ("You Are Unfaithful") and in November 1996 Komuna published their last album Dan koji prolazi zauvek (A Day which Is Passing Forever) produced by Kiki Lesendrić and Igor Borojević. All songs were composed by Kiki and Zoran Babović. Guests were Nenad Stefanović "Japanac" (bass guitar), Nenad Jelić (percussions, vocal), Ana Popović (guitar), Goran Bregović, Maksa Ćatović, Aca Milenković, Miša Amadeus and others. Minor hits from this album were "Neverna si" and "Dan koji prolazi zauvek". The band was dissolved in 1997, and Bread Ventures Records published the greatest hits album Ne veruj u idole the same year.

Kiki Lesendrić & Piloti (2009-present) 
Having released his debut solo album, the 2008 Mesec na vratima (The Moon at the Door), Lesendrić started a promotional tour, Svet je lep kada sanjamo (The World Is Beautiful when We Dream), during which he started performing as Kiki Lesendrić & Piloti. During the same year, PGP-RTS released the greatest hits compilation album Najveći hitovi.

The band performed a 22-date tour of Serbia, Bosnia and Herzegovina, Croatia, Poland and Italy. The recordings of the 2009 Belgrade Beer Fest and Novi Sad Spens Sports Center performances were released on a live album and DVD released in 2010 as Svet je lep kada sanjamo - turneja 2009

In 2012, the band released the album Slučajno i zauvek (Accidentally and Forever). Beside Lesendrić, a part of the material on the album was written by Mlađan Dinkić and a part by Đorđe Balašević.

At the beginning of 2016, the band released their latest studio album, Širom zatvorenih očiju (Eyes Wide Shut). The song "Manje-više" ("More or Less") was recorded with the members of the Croatian band Luminize, and the song "Manje-više" with pop singer Sara Jo.

Legacy 
In 2000, the song "Kao ptica na mom dlanu" was polled No.74 on Rock Express Top 100 Yugoslav Rock Songs of All Times list. In 2011, the same song was polled, by the listeners of Radio 202, one of 60 greatest songs released by PGP-RTB/PGP-RTS during the sixty years of the label's existence.

The lyrics of the song "Imam diplomu" ("I Have a Degree") were featured in Petar Janjatović's book Pesme bratstva, detinjstva & potomstva: Antologija ex YU rok poezije 1967 - 2007 (Songs of Brotherhood, Childhood & Offspring: Anthology of Ex YU Rock Poetry 1967 - 2007).

Discography

Studio albums 
 Piloti (1981)
 Dvadeset godina (1982)
 Kao ptica na mom dlanu (1987)
 Osmeh letnje noći (1988)
 Neka te bog čuva za mene (1990)
 Zaboravljeni (1993)
 Dan koji prolazi zauvek (1996)
 Mesec na vratima (2008)
 Slučajno i zauvek (as Kiki Lesendrić & Piloti; 2012)
 Širom zatvorenih očiju (as Kiki Lesendrić & Piloti; 2016)
 Mali tragovi na nebu (as Kiki Lesendrić & Piloti; 2022)

Compilation albums 
 Najveći hitovi 1981-1991 (1991)
 Ne veruj u idole - Hitovi (1997)
 Najveći hitovi (2009)
 Rekla je da u mojoj glavi čuje gitare i bubnjeve (2017)

Live albums 
 Svet je lep kada sanjamo - turneja 2009 (as Kiki Lesendrić & Piloti, 2010)

Video albums 
 Svet je lep kada sanjamo - turneja 2009 (as Kiki Lesendrić & Piloti, 2010)

See also 
 New wave music in Yugoslavia

References 

Vremeplov: Piloti 
EX YU ROCK enciklopedija 1960-2006, Janjatović Petar;

External links 
Kiki Lesendrić & Piloti official site
Piloti at Discogs
Lyrics on Svaštara

Serbian rock music groups
Serbian pop rock music groups
Serbian new wave musical groups
Yugoslav rock music groups
Musical groups from Belgrade
Musical groups established in 1981